Michael Hoeye (born 1947, in Los Angeles, California) is an American children's writer. He is the author of the Hermux Tantamoq Adventures, a series of children's  mystery novels about a watchmaker mouse.

Hoeye has been variously a farmer, fashion photographer, and high-school teacher. He and his wife, Martha, live in a cottage in Oregon, U.S.A., together with nine large oak trees, six even larger fir trees, and a large cast of squirrels, woodpeckers and other birds. He has also taught at Marylhurst University.

Books
Time Stops for No Mouse (1999)
The Sands of Time (2001)
No Time Like Show Time (2004)
Time to Smell the Roses (2007)

References

External links 

MichaelHoeye.com (official website)

1947 births
Living people
Writers from Oregon
American children's writers
Marylhurst University
Photographers from Oregon